is a professional Japanese baseball player. He plays pitcher for the Chunichi Dragons.

On 20 October 2017, Yamamoto was selected as the 6th draft pick for the Chunichi Dragons at the 2017 NPB Draft and on 18 November signed a provisional contract with a ¥25,000,000 sign-on bonus and a ¥5,500,000 yearly salary.

References

External links

NPB.jp

2000 births
Living people
Japanese baseball players
Nippon Professional Baseball pitchers
Chunichi Dragons players
Baseball people from Hyōgo Prefecture
People from Takarazuka, Hyōgo